Andrew William Enfield (born June 8, 1969) is an American basketball coach who is the men's head coach for the USC Trojans of the Pac-12 Conference. He came to national prominence as head coach at Florida Gulf Coast when it made an unexpected run to the Sweet 16 round of the 2013 NCAA tournament as a No. 15 seed. 

Originally from Shippensburg, Pennsylvania, Enfield played college basketball at Johns Hopkins University as a shooting guard and graduated with 18 school records. He holds the all-time NCAA record for free throw shooting percentage. A basketball coach since 1994, Enfield began his career as an assistant coach for the NBA's Milwaukee Bucks and Boston Celtics, after which he went on a brief hiatus from coaching to work as a business executive. In 2006, Enfield returned to coaching as an assistant at Florida State. Enfield got his first head-coaching position at Florida Gulf Coast in 2011.

After two seasons at Florida Gulf Coast, Enfield became the head coach of the USC Trojans in 2013. Enfield has led USC to five postseason appearances, four in the NCAA Tournament (2016, 2017, 2021, and 2022) and once in the 2018 NIT.

Early life and education 
Andrew William Enfield graduated as class valedictorian from Shippensburg High School in Shippensburg, Pennsylvania. He attended Johns Hopkins University, where he was the first recruit of longtime head basketball head coach Bill Nelson. Enfield was a shooting guard and currently holds 18 school records, such as career points (2,025), single-season points (610), career scoring average (18.8), career field goals (680), career three-pointers (234), career three-point percentage (.470), career free throws (431), single-season free-throw percentage (95.3), and career minutes (3,542). He also set the NCAA record for career free throw percentage (.925) (since broken by Blake Ahearn) and was named a Division III Academic All-American in 1990 and 1991 and NABC All-American in 1991. Enfield graduated from JHU with a bachelor's degree in economics and earned the prestigious NCAA Postgraduate Scholarship. He earned an MBA from the University of Maryland.

Career

Career background 
To supplement his income, Enfield and former Johns Hopkins lacrosse coach Dave Pietramala operated lacrosse and basketball camps, which focused on shooting. This evolved into consulting, where Enfield advertised himself as "the shot doctor." He moved to New York City and formed his first company which sold videos teaching basketball shooting techniques.

In 2000, Enfield invested in and was hired as a vice president of finance at TractManager, a healthcare software startup.The company's founder/CEO, Thomas A. Rizk, said he "saw some genius in Andy in everything he did". Enfield remained with the company for more than five years and, as of March 2013, still owns stock in it; Rizk stated the company is worth significantly more than the $100 million figure he claimed was erroneously reported by Sports Illustrated.

Coaching career

Milwaukee Bucks, Boston Celtics, and Florida State 
Beginning in 1994, Enfield's work as a shooting consultant led to jobs as a shooting coach for two years each with the Milwaukee Bucks and then the Boston Celtics. After leaving TractManager, he was an assistant coach for five years to Leonard Hamilton with the Florida State Seminoles, which earned three trips to the NCAA tournament.

Florida Gulf Coast University 
In 2011, Enfield was hired as the second head coach of Florida Gulf Coast University. In his first season, he led the team to the finals of the Atlantic Sun Conference tournament, losing to regular-season champion Belmont. In 2012–13, FGCU first attracted attention by beating Miami and finishing in second place as the second seed in the Atlantic Sun tournament. After defeating regular season champion Mercer in the championship game, the Eagles earned a No. 15 seed in the South Region of the NCAA tournament, where they upset No. 2 seed Georgetown in the first round and No. 7 seed San Diego State in the second round, making them the first No. 15 seed to reach the regional semifinals (popularly known as the "Sweet 16"). Their run ended after being defeated 62–50 by No. 3 Florida.

USC 
On April 1, 2013, the University of Southern California hired Enfield as its head basketball coach. He replaced Bob Cantu, who took over in the middle of the 2012–13 season on an interim basis from Kevin O'Neill, who was fired. At first, the Trojans could not repeat the success of Enfield's previous team, finishing last in the Pac-12 in Enfield's first two seasons, but they made the NCAA Tournament in his third season. In his fourth season, Enfield and the Trojans got out to a 14–0 start before dropping their conference opener to Oregon. Enfield recorded his 100th win as a head coach in a victory over conference opponent Stanford.

Personal life 
Enfield's wife is former model Amanda Marcum. They have two daughters, Aila and Lily, and a son, Marcum. Enfield was inducted into Johns Hopkins University's Athletic Hall of Fame in 2001.

Head coaching record

References

External links
 USC profile

1969 births
Living people
American men's basketball players
Basketball coaches from Pennsylvania
Basketball players from Pennsylvania
Boston Celtics assistant coaches
Florida Gulf Coast Eagles men's basketball coaches
Florida State Seminoles men's basketball coaches
Johns Hopkins Blue Jays men's basketball players
Milwaukee Bucks assistant coaches
People from Shippensburg, Pennsylvania
USC Trojans men's basketball coaches